Bouville is the name of three communes in France:
 Bouville, Eure-et-Loir
 Bouville, Seine-Maritime
 Bouville, Essonne